Kōtarō Tanaka may refer to:

Kōtarō Tanaka (judge) (1890–1974), Japanese jurist, judge of the International Court of Justice, and politician
Kōtarō Tanaka (photographer) (1901–1995), Japanese photographer
Kōtarō Tanaka (actor, born 1964), see List of Higurashi no Naku Koro ni characters
Kōtarō Tanaka (actor, born 1982), also written as Koutaro Tanaka
Kōtarō Tanaka, musician on "Stay the Ride Alive"